The Rawlings Gold Glove Award, usually referred to as the Gold Glove, is the award given annually to the Major League Baseball players judged to have exhibited superior individual fielding performances at each fielding position in both the National League (NL) and the American League (AL), as voted by the managers and coaches in each league. Managers are not permitted to vote for their own players.  Eighteen Gold Gloves are awarded each year (with the exception of 1957, 1985, 2007 and 2018), one at each of the nine positions in each league. In 1957, the baseball glove manufacturer Rawlings created the Gold Glove Award to commemorate the best fielding performance at each position. The award was created from a glove made from gold lamé-tanned leather and affixed to a walnut base. Initially, only one Gold Glove per position was awarded to the top fielder at each position in the entire league; however, separate awards were given for the National and American Leagues beginning in 1958.

Brooks Robinson won 16 Gold Gloves with the Baltimore Orioles, leading both the American League and all third basemen in awards won. Mike Schmidt is tied with Nolan Arenado second in wins at third base; Schmidt won 10 with the Philadelphia Phillies and is tied for National League third basemen in Gold Gloves. Arenado has 10, 8 with the Rockies and 2 with the Cardinals.  Scott Rolen owns the third-highest total, winning eight awards.  Scott won with the Phillies, the St. Louis Cardinals, and the Cincinnati Reds. Six-time winners at third base are Buddy Bell, Eric Chavez, and Robin Ventura. Adrián Beltré, Ken Boyer, Doug Rader, and Ron Santo have each won five Gold Gloves at third base, and four-time winners include Gary Gaetti  and Matt Williams. Hall of Famers who have won a Gold Glove at the position include Robinson, Rolen, Schmidt, Santo, Wade Boggs, and George Brett.

The fewest errors committed in a third baseman's winning season is five, achieved by Boggs in 1995 and Chavez in 2006. Two National League winners have made six errors in a season to lead that league: Mike Lowell in 2005, and Schmidt in 1986. Chavez' fielding percentage of .987 in 2006 leads all winners; Lowell leads the National League with his .983 mark. Robinson leads all winners with 410 assists in 1974, and made the most putouts in the American League (174 in 1966). The most putouts by a winner was 187, made by Santo in 1967. Schmidt leads the National League in assists, with 396 in 1977. The most double plays turned in a season was 46 by Evan Longoria in 2010. Arenado leads the National League with 44 in 2018.

Ken Boyer and Clete Boyer are the only pair of brothers to have won Gold Glove Awards at third base. Older brother Ken won five Gold Gloves in six years with the Cardinals (1958–1961, 1963), and Clete won in 1969 with the Atlanta Braves.

Key

American League winners

National League winners

Footnotes
In 1957, Gold Gloves were given to the top fielders in Major League Baseball, instead of separate awards for the National and American Leagues; therefore, the winners are the same in each table.

References
General

Inline citations

External links
Rawlings Gold Glove Award Website

Gold Glove Award